The SNCF Class BB 8500 class are part of a series of electric locomotives built by Alsthom for SNCF. They are the direct current version of the 25 kV alternating current SNCF BB 17000 and dual system SNCF BB 25500.

The locomotives are fitted with monomotor bogies with two different gear ratios. This allows them to increase their tractive effort in exchange for a reduction in their top speed. This makes them suitable for both freight and passenger trains. They acquired the nickname Danseuses (dancers) due to their tendency to sway from side to side at speed, which led to them being blacked at a number of depots.

They were built in three distinct batches, leading to detail differences. They remain in use as mixed traffic locomotives, mostly with TER and but with some remaining for special duties. Thirty locomotives, dedicated to empty stock moves, have been reclassified as BB 88500. Likewise in 2001, 20 of the class were rebuilt for freight banking workings on the Maurienne line. They were classified as BB 8700 for this period.

Names
Five members of the class were named.

Preservation
A single locomotive, BB 8616, is preserved at Mohon.

References

Alstom locomotives
B-B locomotives
08500
Standard gauge electric locomotives of France
1500 V DC locomotives
Railway locomotives introduced in 1964